Aurangabad is a census town in the Suti II CD block in the Jangipur subdivision of the Murshidabad district in the Indian state of West Bengal. The town lies between The Ganga and the feeder canal.

Geography

Location                     

According to the map of Suti II CD block in the District Census Handbook, Murshidabad, Dafahat, Jagtaj, Debipur, Aurangabad, Hafania, Mahendrapur, Paschim Punropara, Bhabki, Khidirpur, Khanpur, Ichhlampur, Chakmeghoan and Kakramari, form a cluster of census towns.

Area overview
Jangipur subdivision is crowded with 52 census towns and as such it had to be presented in two location maps. One of the maps can be seen alongside. The subdivision is located in the Rarh region that is spread over from adjoining Santhal Pargana division of Jharkhand. The land is slightly higher in altitude than the surrounding plains and is gently undulating. The river Ganges, along with its distributaries, is prominent in both the maps. At the head of the subdivision is the 2,245 m long Farakka Barrage, one of the largest projects of its kind in the country. Murshidabad district shares with Bangladesh a porous international border which is notoriously crime prone (partly shown in this map). The subdivision has two large power plants - the 2,100 MW Farakka Super Thermal Power Station and the 1,600 MW Sagardighi Thermal Power Station. According to a 2016 report, there are around 1,000,000 (1 million/ ten lakh) workers engaged in the beedi industry in Jangipur subdivision. 90% are home-based and 70% of the home-based workers are women. As of 2013, an estimated 2.4 million people reside along the banks of the Ganges alone in Murshidabad district. Severe erosion occurs along the banks.

Note: The two maps present some of the notable locations in the subdivision. All places marked in the maps are linked in the larger full screen maps.

History

Demographics
According to the 2011 Census of India, Aurangabad had a total population of 39,261, of which 19,474 (50%) were males and 19,787 (49%) were females. Population in the age range 0–6 years was 6,529. The total number of literate persons in Aurangabad was 21,027 (64.24% of the population over 6 years).

As per 2001 Census of India Aurangabad had a population of 32,134. Males constitute 50% of the population and females 50%. Aurangabad has an average literacy rate of 44%, lower than the national average of 59.5%: male literacy is 52%, and female literacy is 36%. In Aurangabad, 19% of the population is under 6 years of. Aurangabad also includes Mahendrapur village which has a population of 6979.

Infrastructure
According to the District Census Handbook, Murshidabad,  2011, Aurangabad covered an area of 2.77 km2. The protected water-supply involved overhead tank, tube well, borwell. It had 3099 domestic electric connections. Among the medical facilities it had 5 dispensaries/ health centres, 11 medicine shops. Among the educational facilities, it had 18 primary schools, 1 middle school,  2 secondary schools, 2 senior secondary schools, 1 general degree college. It had 1 recognised shorthand, typewriting, vocational training institution. Among the social cultural and recreational facilities it had 1 stadium, 1 auditorium/ community hall. It produced beedi, spices, handloom. It had branches of 2 nationalised banks, 1 private commercial bank.

Education
College

Dukhulal Nibaran Chandra College of Aurangabad is recognized by UGC.

Schools

Aurangabad High School (H. S) of Aurangabad is maintained by the 'National University of Educational Planning and Administration' under the program 'District Information System for Education 2013-2014.

Aurangabad Balika Vidyalaya

Chhabghati K.D. Vidyalaya (H.S.)

English Oriental Academy, CBSE Board

Aurangabad High Madrasah (H.S)

Ideal Education Mission School

Nimtita G. D Institution

Panchagram I. S. A High School

Aurangabad PTTI

Aurangabad Public School

Altab Hossain PTTI

As Sabin Mission

ARTM Public School

Prabananda Vidyapith

Gurukul Sikhsha Niketan

Aurangabad Public School 

Other institutions

Jakir Hossain Institute of Polytechnic

Aurangabad B.Ed College

Nathulal Das B.Ed College

Am Teacher's  Training college

Aurangabad B.Ed Training College

J.S B.Ed College

Industry
Aurangabad is noted for its beedi industry.

Healthcare
Aurangabad has a Primary Health Centre (PHC).

Suti II CD block is one of the areas of Murshidabad district where ground water is affected by a high level of arsenic contamination. The WHO guideline for arsenic in drinking water is 10 mg/ litre, and the Indian Standard value is 50 mg/ litre. The maximum concentration in Suti II CD block is 1,852 mg/litre.

Electoral constituencies
Aurangabad was assembly constituency No. 51 of West Bengal; later as recommendations of Delimitation Commission were implemented, this area was part of new assembly constituency No. 57, Suti, which will contain the whole area under Suti I and Suti II CD Blocks.

References

Cities and towns in Murshidabad district